The Lüft-ü Celil class was a pair of ironclad warships built for the Ottoman Navy by a French shipyard in the late 1860s. The ships were sea-going monitors that mounted their main battery of two  Armstrong guns and two  Armstrong guns in two revolving gun turrets.

Both vessels saw action during the Russo-Turkish War of 1877–1878, where Lüft-ü Celil was sunk by a Russian artillery battery on the Danube. Hifz-ur Rahman engaged Russian minelayers at the mouth of the Danube but otherwise saw little action. She survived the war and was laid up for the following twenty years. She was mobilized at the outbreak of the Greco-Turkish War in 1897, but like the rest of the Ottoman fleet, was in poor condition. The ship was eventually sold in 1909 and broken up.

Design
In the early 1860s, the Eyalet of Egypt, a province of the Ottoman Empire, ordered several ironclad warships for its fleet as part of a rearmament program to again challenge the power of the central government—the last having been the Second Egyptian–Ottoman War twenty years earlier. These included the two Lüft-ü Celil-class vessels, ordered in 1866. After lengthy negotiations, the crisis was resolved when the Egyptian ironclads, including Lüft-ü Celil and Hifz-ur Rahman, were transferred to the central government on 29 August 1868, among other concessions made by Egypt.

Characteristics

The hull was constructed with iron, incorporated a ram bow, and a raised forecastle and sterncastle. They displaced  normally and  BOM. They had a crew of 12 officers and 110 enlisted men.

The ships were powered by a single horizontal compound engine which drove two screw propellers. Steam was provided by two coal-fired locomotive boilers that were trunked into a single funnel amidships. Lüft-ü Celil carried  of coal. A supplementary barque rig with three masts was also fitted.

Lüft-ü Celil and Hifz-ur Rahman were seagoing monitors armed with a battery of two  muzzle loading Armstrong guns and two  Armstrong guns, each pair mounted in a revolving gun turret, both of which were on the centerline. The 225 mm guns were placed in the forward turret and the turret for the 178 mm guns was located aft of the main mast. The turrets were hand-operated. In 1875, both ships received a single  gun manufactured by Krupp. In 1891–1894, Hifz-ur Rahman was partially rearmed. The two 225 mm guns were replaced with a pair  Krupp guns, and four  Hotchkiss guns and two  Nordenfelt guns were added.

The two ships were armored with wrought iron plates. The turrets were protected by 140 mm of iron plating.

Ships

Service history

Both ships of the class were stationed in Crete after they entered service, to assist in stabilizing the island in the aftermath of the Cretan Revolt of 1866–1869. Nevertheless, the Ottoman fleet remained largely inactive during this period. Both ships saw action during the Russo-Turkish War of 1877–1878, where they operated against Russian forces in the Black Sea. At the start of the war, Lüft-ü Celil and Hifz-ur Rahman were assigned to the Danube Squadron, where they were tasked with preventing Russian forces from crossing the river. While on patrol on 11 May 1877, Lüft-ü Celil engaged a Russian artillery battery, and one of the Russian shells struck the vessel, probably in the boiler room, where it caused a large explosion that destroyed the ship, killing most of her crew. Hifz-ur Rahman later assisted in the defense of Sulina at the mouth of the Danube, and engaged Russian minelayers in an action on 9 November 1877 where she was lightly damaged.

Hifz-ur Rahman was laid up in Constantinople. She was refitted at the Imperial Arsenal in 1891–1894, but was nevertheless in poor condition by the outbreak of the Greco-Turkish War in February 1897, like the rest of the ancient Ottoman ironclad fleet. As a result, the fleet was kept safely behind the Dardanelles forts and it saw no action. The ship remained in service for another decade until she was decommissioned in 1909; she was sold in November that year to ship breakers and thereafter dismantled.

Notes

References